Prioria copaifera is a tree in the family Fabaceae, native to tropical regions of Central and South America, where it occurs in tidal estuaries behind the mangrove fringe. It ranges from Nicaragua to Colombia and is also found in Jamaica.

The wood of Prioria copaifera can be used in carpentry and cabinet-making. Heartwood of the Prioria copaifera tree secretes a black resin when cut. Orchid bees collect this resin for nest construction.

In Costa Rica Prioria copaifera is protected as a threatened species.

References

 Waynesword
 Mabberley, D.J. (2002) The Plant-book. A portable dictionary of the vascular plants, Second edition, Cambridge University Press, 858 pp.
 C. Sandi and E.M. Flores. Escuela de Agricultura del Trópico Húmedo and Academia Nacional de Ciencias de Costa Rica, Costa Rica

Detarioideae
Flora of Colombia
Flora of Costa Rica
Flora of Nicaragua
Flora of Panama
Flora of Jamaica
Flora without expected TNC conservation status